Reluctant Island is a small island off eastern Horseshoe Island. Surveyed by Falkland Islands Dependencies Survey (FIDS) in 1955–57. So named because of the feature's apparent reluctance to be recognized as an island; it did not appear on maps of the British Graham Land Expedition (BGLE) 1934–37 and was mapped as a peninsula by FIDS in 1948–50.

See also 

 List of Antarctic and sub-Antarctic islands

Islands of Graham Land
Fallières Coast